The 1983 Women's European Volleyball Championship was the thirteenth edition of the event, organised by Europe's governing volleyball body, the Confédération Européenne de Volleyball. It was hosted in several cities in East Germany from 17 to 25 September 1983, with the final round held in Rostock.

Participating teams

Format
The tournament was played in two different stages. In the first stage, the twelve participants were divided into three groups of four teams each. In the second stage, two groups were formed, one containing the winners and runners-up from all first stage groups (six teams in total) to contest the tournament title. A second group was formed by the remaining six teams which played for position places (7th to 12th). All groups in both stages played a single round-robin format.

Pools composition

Squads

Venues

Preliminary round

Pool 1
venue location: Schwerin, East Germany

|}

|}

Pool 2
venue location: Cottbus, East Germany

|}

|}

Pool 3
venue location: Rostock, East Germany

|}

|}

Final round

7th–12th pool
venue location: Cottbus, East Germany

|}

|}

Final pool
venue location: Rostock, East Germany

|}

|}

Final ranking

References
 Confédération Européenne de Volleyball (CEV)

External links
 Results at todor66.com

European Volleyball Championships
V
Women's European Volleyball Championships
Volleyball Championship
Women's European Volleyball Championship
International volleyball competitions hosted by Germany
Women's European Volleyball Championship
Women's volleyball in East Germany